The United States competed in the 2017 Summer Deaflympics which was held in Samsun, Turkey. They sent a delegation consisting of 58 participants for the event.

Participants 
The United States sent the following number of participants per sport to the 2017 Summer Deaflympics.

Medal table

References 

United States at the Deaflympics
2017 in American sports
Nations at the 2017 Summer Deaflympics